The qualifying heats of the Women's 800 metres Freestyle event at the 1998 European Short Course Swimming Championships were held on the first day of the competition, on Friday 11 December 1998 in Sheffield, England. The heats resulted in declared winners.

Finals

References
 Results
 Swimsite

F
E
1998 in women's swimming